Syed Aijaz Hussain Shah is a Pakistani politician who has been a member of the Provincial Assembly of Sindh since August 2018.

Political career
He was elected 2 times union council nazim in 2001 and 2004 
He was elected to the (provincial assembly of sindh) as a candidate of the { pakistan people's party} from constituency ps_53 {Tando Muhammad Khan} in 2013 general elections 
He was elected to the Provincial Assembly of Sindh as a candidate of the Pakistan Peoples Party from Constituency PS-68 (Tando Muhammad Khan-I) in the 2018 Pakistani general election.

References

Living people
Pakistan People's Party MPAs (Sindh)
Year of birth missing (living people)